The Acura CL-X is a concept car built by Acura (in conjunction with its parent company Honda) for the 1995 North American International Auto Show in Detroit. The particular car shown had special carbon fiber and aluminum composite wheels designed for performance.

Production 
The car entered production as the Acura CL in February 1996. It initially replaced the coupe variant of the Acura Legend, then evolved to become a coupe form of the Acura TL.

References 

CL-X
Concept cars